W. Herbert McCauley (born May 2, 1957 in Durham, North Carolina) is an American Thoroughbred horse racing jockey who has been called  "one of the most talented and aggressive riders of his generation" by John Piesen, an odds-maker for the  New York Post and the Daily Racing Form.

While still a small boy, Herb McCauley began riding  horses on his grandfather's farm. At age sixteen, he embarked on a career in Thoroughbred racing, breaking yearlings at William L. McKnight's Tartan Farms near Ocala, Florida. Within two years, McCauley moved north where he began his riding career at Monmouth Park Racetrack in New Jersey. In October 1975 he rode the first of his more than three thousand career winners at Keystone Racetrack in Philadelphia. For the next twenty-three years McCauley was a top jockey at tracks in the U.S. northeast and notably rode five winners from five mounts in a single racecard on November 18, 1985 at Meadowlands Racetrack in East Rutherford, New Jersey.

On July 10, 1998, Herb McCauley suffered compound fractures to the tibia and fibula of his left leg in an accident at Monmouth Park. The injury resulted in him undergoing four surgical proceedings followed by a lengthy rehabilitation process. With his career in ruins, McCauley's personal life suffered and he turned to alcohol in a misguided effort to cope. Having suffering from bulimia since his teens, in a May 1999 conference on the various disorders some athletes have to deal with, McCauley spoke publicly for the first time about his battle as a jockey to maintain riding weight that resulted in constant binging and purging.

Unable to ride, for a time McCauley served as an agent for jockeys but more than eight years after being sidelined he decided to attempt a comeback. Following an intense training program, in September 2007 he returned to riding competitively and a few weeks later earned his first win in nine years at Meadowlands Racetrack.

In 2007, Herb McCauley was nominated for induction in the National Museum of Racing and Hall of Fame.

References

 Reprint of a May 23, 1999 article by Bill Handleman of the Asbury Park Press at Mind Body and Sports
 Herb McCauley at the NTRA
 October 18, 2007 Bloodhorse.com article on Herb McCauley
 

1957 births
Living people
American jockeys
Sportspeople from Durham, North Carolina